Perry Farrell (born Peretz Bernstein; March 29, 1959) is an American singer, songwriter and musician, best known as the frontman of the alternative rock band Jane's Addiction. Farrell created the touring festival Lollapalooza as part (one of the venues) of a farewell tour for Jane's Addiction in 1991; it has since evolved into an annual destination festival. Farrell continues to produce Lollapalooza with partners William Morris Agency and C3 Presents. He has also led the alternative rock groups Porno for Pyros and Satellite Party.

Biography
Born Peretz Bernstein in Queens, New York City to a Jewish family, he spent his grade-school years in Woodmere, Long Island, and moved to North Miami Beach, Florida with his family during his teens. His father was a jeweler and his mother was an artist who died by suicide when Farrell was three, an event later noted in the Jane's Addiction songs "Then She Did" and "Twisted Tales".

His early musical influences included the Beatles, the Rolling Stones, Led Zeppelin, Sly and the Family Stone, and James Brown. Other influences later were David Bowie, Iggy Pop, and Lou Reed. After graduating from high school, Farrell moved to California in the early 1980s to live as a surfer. There, he lived in his car and made money working construction and waiting tables.

He has a son, Yobel (born 1998), with ex-girlfriend Christine Cagle. In 2002, Farrell married Etty Lau Farrell, a professional dancer and singer who has performed in all of the Jane's Addiction shows since the Relapse tour in 1997. The couple have two sons together.

Music career

Psi Com (1981–1985)
He became the frontman for the post-punk band Psi Com in Los Angeles, and traveled in a larger community of area musicians including the bands X, Red Hot Chili Peppers, Fishbone, Oingo Boingo, and the Minutemen. Psi Com broke up around 1985 and Farrell met Eric Avery through mutual friends. The two began jam sessions which would become the initial foundation for Jane's Addiction. It was during this period that Bernstein chose the pseudonym Perry Farrell for himself as a play on the word "peripheral".

Jane's Addiction (1985–1991, 1997, 2001–2004, 2008–present)
Jane's Addiction made its name in mid-1980s LA by building up a rabid fan base with legendary, high-energy shows in small LA rock clubs. Jane's Addiction, prior to their first break-up, released three albums: Jane's Addiction, Nothing's Shocking and Ritual de lo Habitual. A B-sides album from the Ritual sessions, titled Live and Rare, was released in Japan. Late in 1991, Jane's Addiction broke up due to internal tensions over differing ideologies mostly centering on drug use, notably Farrell's severe addiction to heroin. Around this time, as mentioned in the Spin magazine (1991 Vol. 7 Num. 3) article about their "Ritual" tour, a rumor got around that Farrell had contracted HIV. Apparently for amusement, Farrell would tease audiences with "news" of his supposed health and would neither confirm nor deny its truth. In 1993 Farrell and his ex-girlfriend Casey Niccoli released a film called Gift that featured Jane's Addiction. Gift was released by Warner Brothers. In 1997, Jane's Addiction reformed for a brief reunion tour with Flea replacing Avery on bass.

Farrell has sometimes been credited with changing the fortunes of the Coachella Valley Music and Arts Festival. Following the festival's disastrous first year in 1999, the event was not held in 2000. In 2001, a decision was made to organize the festival again, but just a few months before the festival was set to occur, there was still no headlining group. Farrell, who was friends with the festival organizers, decided to reunite Jane's Addiction for the 2001 event, which helped draw large crowds and allowed the festival to yield a profit (which was not the case in 1999). This began a Coachella tradition of reuniting at least one major artist each year.

Farrell again toured with Jane's Addiction in 2001 and 2003.  In 2003, Jane's Addiction released an album, Strays. It quickly became one of their best selling records and was certified Gold in the USA and Silver in UK. They toured extensively in North America and Europe, brought back Lollapalooza for the first time since 1997, as well as performing at the Big Day Out festivals in Australia and New Zealand. Internal struggles saw the band split up again in early 2004. A "best of" release following the breakup of this incarnation of the band was released in 2006, titled Up from the Catacombs.

The four original members of Jane's Addiction played their first show together in 17 years at the first United States edition of the NME Awards on April 23, 2008, and played two small shows in Los Angeles during late 2008. The reunited Jane's Addiction re-debuted at SXSW in 2009 and kicked off a summer tour with Nine Inch Nails. Eric Avery again left the band in late 2009, leaving Farrell, Navarro and Perkins as the remaining members of Jane's Addiction. The band with Dave Sitek on bass released The Great Escape Artist in 2011 and have continued to tour.

Porno for Pyros (1992–1998)

Following the break-up of Jane's Addiction, Farrell formed Porno for Pyros with former bandmate Stephen Perkins as well as newcomers Peter DiStefano on guitar and Martyn LeNoble on bass. Together they released two albums, Porno for Pyros and Good God's Urge.

Solo career (1999–present)

Kicking off his solo career, Farrell released rev in 1999, a compilation featuring songs from his previous two bands as well as two new solo songs. In 2001, he released his debut solo album, Song Yet to Be Sung, with lyrics inspired by Kabbalah.

Farrell has released a number of solo tracks online, all of them recorded with the involvement of wife Etty Lau. Their song "Go All the Way (Into the Twilight)" appeared on the Twilight film soundtrack.

In October 2018, Farrell signed with BMG Rights Management; they and PerryEttyVS LLC released his upcoming album Kind Heaven in 2019.

Satellite Party (2004–2008)

Farrell formed a new band/theatrical entity entitled the Satellite Party. Satellite Party is a concept album and is the story of a fictional band of musicians called the Solutionists who are trying to change the world. Farrell conceived the project with his wife Etty Lau Farrell. Etty sings and plays her part on the record as well as the live stage shows. Satellite Party made its debut in Los Angeles at The Key Club on July 18, 2005, followed by a performance at Lollapalooza 2005 which was held in Grant Park in downtown Chicago on July 24, 2005.

Their debut album, Ultra Payloaded, was released on May 29, 2007, on Columbia Records, with contributions from artists such as John Frusciante and Flea of the Red Hot Chili Peppers, electronic dance producers Hybrid, former Red Hot Chili Peppers/Pearl Jam drummer Jack Irons, Joy Division/New Order bassist Peter Hook, and Fergie of the Black Eyed Peas.

Satellite Party performed at the Coachella Valley Music and Arts Festival on April 27, 2007. On June 8 they performed at the Download Festival at Donington, UK. On June 29 they performed alongside Pearl Jam, Kings of Leon and Queens of the Stone Age at Rock Werchter, Belgium. They performed at Buzz Beach Ball 3 in Kansas City (a concert sponsored by KRBZ), and EndFest 16 in Seattle.

Lollapalooza
In 1991, prior to Jane's Addiction dissolving, Farrell, Ted Gardener, and Marc Geiger created the Lollapalooza festival as a farewell tour for Jane's Addiction. From its inception until 1997 and the revival in 2003, the festival toured North America. In 2004, the festival organizers decided to expand the dates to two days per city, but poor ticket sales forced the tour to be canceled. In 2005, Farrell and the William Morris Agency partnered up with Austin, Texas-based company Capital Sports Entertainment (now C3 Presents) retooling it as a weekend destination festival in Grant Park.

Kidzapalooza
In 2005, music producer Tor Hyams approached Farrell with the idea of creating a kids' stage with family-friendly fare at Lollapalooza. Kidzapalooza came to be that year, produced by Hyams and continues to this day with guests like Slash, Patti Smith and LeAnn Rimes appearing in the lineup of artists.

PurimPalooza 2006
In 2006, Farrell performed at Purimpalooza, which celebrates the Jewish holiday of Purim. It was a concert for all ages and presented different Jewish musical groups. It took place in Ruby Skye in San Francisco, and featured bands including Moshav, Chutzpah, and Matisyahu.

Work outside music
Farrell has made a docudrama titled Gift released in 1993 which featured various songs by Farrell and included Farrell's then-girlfriend Casey Niccoli. Gift was released to VHS home video by Warner Bros but never released to DVD.

He joined forces with Tom Morello and his Axis of Justice tour to raise money for the homeless in Los Angeles and together they both physically removed debris in the Ninth Ward of New Orleans in the aftermath of Hurricane Katrina to assist local musicians. They also raised funds for "Road Recovery" a New York non-profit organization which helps young people battling with addiction and other adversities.

Farrell is an environmentalist. He met British prime minister Tony Blair at 10 Downing Street on January 31, 2007, to discuss global warming. He presented Blair with a CD of the Satellite Party track "Woman in the Window".

He worked with Global Cool in 2007 to help promote green living.

Farrell has worked to bring music festivals to Israel, including Lollapalooza, and Jane's Addiction itself has performed in Israel. However, the Lollapalooza event fell through, with the organizers citing financial concerns and lack of talent willing to perform in Israel. Farrell sang at a "Stand with Israel" party held at 7 World Trade Center which is by Ground Zero in New York City.

Discography
Psi Com
 1985 Psi Com EP

Jane's Addiction
 1987 Jane's Addiction
 1988 Nothing's Shocking
 1990 Ritual de lo Habitual
 1991 Live and Rare (Compilation of B-Sides and the remix of "Been Caught Stealing")
 1997 Kettle Whistle (compilation of live tracks, demos and unreleased material)
 2003 Strays
 2006 Up from the Catacombs (greatest hits album)
 2009 A Cabinet of Curiosities (box set)
 2011 The Great Escape Artist

Porno for Pyros
 1993 Porno for Pyros
 1996 Good God's Urge

Kind Heaven Orchestra
 2021 Mend

Solo
 1999 Rev (compilation)
 2001 Song Yet to Be Sung
 2019 Kind Heaven
 2021 The Glitz; The Glamour (box set)

Satellite Party
 2007 Ultra Payloaded

Miscellaneous musical appearances and collaborations
 Sampled on the track "Ringfinger" on the Nine Inch Nails album Pretty Hate Machine (1989).
 Featured on the track "Ripple" on a tribute/environmental benefit to the Grateful Dead called Deadicated (1991).
 Contributed vocals to the song "Hot Lava" on Chef Aid: The South Park Album (1998).
 Contributed vocals to the song "Children of Night" along with Exene Cervenka for the Doors tribute album Stoned Immaculate: The Music of the Doors (2000).
 Featured on the track "King Z" on Mad Professor's "best of" album Method to the Madness (2005).
 Featured on the track "Time of your Life" on Paul Oakenfold's album Bunkka (2002).
 Contributed vocals to the song "The Patience Bossa" along with Debbie Harry for the compilation album A World of Happiness (2004).
 Featured on the track "Revolution Solution" on Thievery Corporation's album The Cosmic Game (2005).
 Featured on the track "Dogstar" on Hybrid's album I Choose Noise (2006).
 Featured on the track "Shake My Shit" on the Nightwatchman's album The Fabled City (2008).
 Contributed the song "Go All the Way (Into the Twilight)" to the Twilight Soundtrack (2008).
 Contributed the song "Nasty Little Perv" to NCIS: The Official TV Soundtrack (2009).
 Contributed the song "New Moon" to the compilation album A World of Happiness (2009 re-release only).
 Contributed vocals to the song "Killing Time" on Infected Mushroom's album Legend of the Black Shawarma (2009).
 Featured on the track "Honey If You Love Him" on Erasure singer Andy Bell's album Non-Stop (2010).
 Featured on the track "Blink" on the Zed's Dead's album Somewhere Else (2014).
 Featured on the track "Got to Get You into My Life" on the Paul McCartney tribute album The Art of McCartney (2014).
 Featured on the tracks "I Got a Line on You" and "One/Jump into the Fire" on the self-titled album from the supergroup Hollywood Vampires (2015).
 Featured on the track "I Really Blew It" on the Taylor Hawkins and the Coattail Riders album Get the Money (2019).
 Featured on the track "Rock On" on the Marc Bolan tribute album AngelHeaded Hipster: The Songs Of Marc Bolan & T. Rex (2020).
 Featured on the track  "Oh the Sunn!" on  the Avalanches album We Will Always Love You (2020)
 Featured on the track  "So Trendy" on  Sleaford Mods album UK Grim (2023)

References

External links

 
 
 Perry on Virgin Records
 Justin's Jane's Addiction: Perry Farrell
 
 Perry Farrell – VH1
 April 2007 Podcast Interview with Perry Farrell at SynthesisRadio.net
 Videos from a May 2007 Press Conference with Perry Farrell
 Interview on kevchino.com

1959 births
Living people
American male singers
American rock singers
American tenors
Music festival founders
Jewish American musicians
Jewish heavy metal musicians
Singers from New York (state)
Jane's Addiction members
Porno for Pyros members
People from Queens, New York
People from Bayside, Queens
People from Woodmere, New York
Alternative metal musicians
Satellite Party members